Lange Airfield (ICAO: EELM) is an airfield in Lange (location of Estonian Aviation Museum), Tartu County, Estonia.

The airfield's owner is Estonian Aviation Museum.

References

Airports in Estonia
Buildings and structures in Tartu County
Kastre Parish